The 2009–10 Lebanese Premier League was the 49th season of top-tier football in Lebanon. A total of twelve teams are competing in the league, with Al-Nejmeh the defending champions. The season began on 10 October 2009 and will concluded in May 2010.

Teams
League size was increased from eleven to twelve teams for this season. Salam Zgharta were relegated to the second level of Lebanese football after ending the 2008–09 season in last place. Promoted from the second level were Al Islah Bourg Shamaly and Al-Ahli Saida.

Stadia and locations

Managerial changes

Final league table

Fixtures and results

References

2009–10 Lebanese Premier League
Lebanese Premier League seasons
Leb
1